James Penberthy AM (3 May 191729 March 1999) was an Australian composer and journalist.

Biography
He was born Albert James Penberthy in Melbourne in 1917. He served with the Royal Australian Navy during World War II. He then studied at the University of Melbourne, where he obtained first class honours in composition. He later studied composition with Nadia Boulanger in Paris, and conducting with Sir John Barbirolli in England. He made his home in Perth, Western Australia, where he founded the West Australian Opera Company and was co-founder of the West Australian Ballet with his third wife, the Monaco-born Russian dancer Kira Bousloff.

In 1975 he moved to the north coast of New South Wales. He founded the School of Arts at Southern Cross University.  He died there in 1999.

Works
He wrote prolifically in many genres, but is best known for his 22 ballets and 11 operas. His best known works are The Beach Inspector and the Mermaid and Ophelia of the Nine Mile Beach.  Many of his works have Australian Indigenous connections: the ballets Euroka (1947), Brolga (1949), Boomerang (1951), The Whirlwind (1954) and Kooree and the Mists (1960) are all based on Aboriginal legends, with Kooree and the Mists being written for Mary Joyce Miller, the first Aboriginal ballet dancer in Western Australia. The operas Larry (1955), The Earth Mother (1958) and Dalgerie (1958) explore the relationships between the Indigenous inhabitants and the European settlers.

Also, Penberthy's Piano Concerto No. 2 (1955) is subtitled "Aboriginal"; Julunggul and Kadjari (1957) is a ritual dance for orchestra, and the Sextet for flute, oboe, clarinet, horn and two bassoons (1954) employs Aboriginal melodies and rhythms.

Personal life
Penberthy was married four times, all four marriages ending in divorce.  He had a son (David) with Dorothy (née Kerin); a son (Richard) to Barbara (née Paterson); a daughter (Dr Tamara Walters) to Kira Bousloff (née Abricossova), co-founder of the West Australian Ballet; and he was also married to Constance (aka Claire) Bramley.

Honours
Penberthy was awarded the degree of Doctor of Music from the University of Melbourne in 1975, and was appointed a Member (AM) of the Order of Australia in 1986.

References

Further reading 
 Barkl, Michael. 1997.  James Penberthy.  The Oxford Companion to Australian Music (ed. Warren Bebbington).  Melbourne:  OUP.

1917 births
1999 deaths
Musicians from Melbourne
Members of the Order of Australia
20th-century classical composers
Ballet composers
Australian opera composers
Male opera composers
Academic staff of Southern Cross University
Australian male classical composers
20th-century Australian musicians
20th-century Australian male musicians
20th-century Australian journalists